Right America: Feeling Wronged – Some Voices from the Campaign Trail is a documentary film directed by Alexandra Pelosi. The film premiered on HBO on President's Day 2009. This is the first film to document the birth of the Tea Party Movement.

Synopsis
This is a documentary that highlights conservative American reactions to the Democratic victory of the 2008 presidential election.

References

External links 
 
 
 Right America: Feeling Wronged – Some Voices from the Campaign Trail at HBO

2009 television films
2009 films
American documentary television films
Documentary films about American politics
Tea Party movement
Films directed by Alexandra Pelosi
2008 United States presidential election in popular culture
2000s English-language films
2000s American films